Empress Xiaoyi may refer to:

Xiao Wenshou (343–423), empress dowager of Liu Song, stepmother of Liu Yu (Emperor Wu)
Empress Dowager Xiaoyi (Ming dynasty) (1397–1462), mother of the Jingtai Emperor
Empress Xiaoyizhuang (1530–1558), wife of the Longqing Emperor
Empress Xiaoyiren (died 1689), wife of the Kangxi Emperor
Empress Xiaoyichun (1727–1775), concubine of the Qianlong Emperor